Robert Louis Stevenson (born February 7, 1976) is a former American college football player who was a punter and placekicker for the Florida Gators football team of the University of Florida.

Early years 

Stevenson was born in Bradenton, Florida, and grew up playing soccer.  He attended Manatee High School in Bradenton, and was the starting placekicker and punter for the Manatee Hurricanes high school football team from 1992 to 1994.  The Hurricanes won the Florida Class 5A state football championship in 1992, in which Stevenson kicked a 47-yard field goal, and returned to the state final again in 1993.  As a senior in 1994, he was recognized by USA Today as a high school All-American.  Ironically, Stevenson wanted to play quarterback, but the Hurricanes needed a kicker more, and as a lifetime soccer player, he filled the need.

College career 

Stevenson accepted an athletic scholarship to attend the University of Florida in Gainesville, Florida, where he  played for coach Steve Spurrier's Florida Gators football team from 1995 to 1997.  He earned the starting punter position as a true freshman in 1995, and served as the Gators' primary punter through the end of his junior season in 1997.

Prior to the 1998 season, Stevenson was diagnosed with Graves' disease.  Although he initially hoped to take a medical redshirt in 1998 and return the following year, the diagnosis effectively ended his football career.

Stevenson was criticized by some commentators for his inconsistency, as evidenced by delivering short kicks in lopsided victories but long punts in pressure situations when they mattered most.  His longest punt was sixty-four yards against the Vanderbilt Commodores in 1996.  Stevenson posted a career average of 40.7 yards per punt during his three-year tenure as the Gators starting punter, which ranks seventh on the Gators' all-time list—one place ahead of his Gators head coach, Steve Spurrier.

Stevenson's best season average was 42.1 yards per punt in 1996, when Florida won the Southeastern Conference (SEC) title with an undefeated 8–0 conference season, and defeated the top-ranked Florida State Seminoles in the Sugar Bowl to win the consensus national championship.  During the 1997 season, he handled both the punting and kickoff duties for the Gators.  Stevenson proved to be a weapon on kickoffs, with twenty-one of seventy-one kickoffs resulting in touchbacks, and over half of his kickoffs reaching the opposing goal line or beyond.

Life after football 

Stevenson graduated from the University of Florida with a bachelor's degree in health and human performance in 2001.  He currently works as a Manatee County deputy sheriff.  He and his wife Holly live in Palmetto , Florida, and they have three daughters.

See also 

 Florida Gators football
 List of University of Florida alumni

References

Bibliography 

 Carlson, Norm, University of Florida Football Vault: The History of the Florida Gators, Whitman Publishing, LLC, Atlanta, Georgia (2007).  .
 Golenbock, Peter, Go Gators!  An Oral History of Florida's Pursuit of Gridiron Glory, Legends Publishing, LLC, St. Petersburg, Florida (2002).  .
 Hairston, Jack, Tales from the Gator Swamp: A Collection of the Greatest Gator Stories Ever Told, Sports Publishing, LLC, Champaign, Illinois (2002).  .
 McCarthy, Kevin M.,  Fightin' Gators: A History of University of Florida Football, Arcadia Publishing, Mount Pleasant, South Carolina (2000).  .
 Nash, Noel, ed., The Gainesville Sun Presents The Greatest Moments in Florida Gators Football, Sports Publishing, Inc., Champaign, Illinois (1998).  .

1976 births
Living people
Sportspeople from Bradenton, Florida
Players of American football from Florida
American football punters
Florida Gators football players
American police officers